Vladimir Mikhailovich Moskovkin (born 5 February 1952, Yalta, Crimea) is a Russian and Ukrainian geographer, economist, scientometrist, teacher, publicist. Doctor of Geographical Sciences, professor.

In 1969 he finished Yalta Comprehensive School № 6 and graduated from the Moscow State University Correspondence Mathematical School.

In 1975 he graduated from KSU (Kazan State University) Faculty of Mechanics and Mathematics.

In 1976 he held a position of an engineer in the Crimean Landslide Protection Office, Yalta.

In 1977 he held a Senior Laboratory Assistant position at the Soil and Climatic Research Department of the State Nikitsky Botanical Garden (Yalta).

From 1977 to 1978 he held a position of an engineer at the Soil Erosion Department of the Ukrainian Soils Science and Agricultural Chemistry Research Institute (Kharkov).

From 1978 to 1990 he held a Junior Researcher position, then a Senior Researcher position and then worked as a Head of the Yalta Department All-Union Water Conservation Research Institute at the State Committee of Nature Protection of the USSR  (Kharkov).

From 1990 to 1992 he worked as a Head of the Yalta Department in the Sochi Research Centre “Recreation Territories Management and Tourism” at the USSR Academy of Sciences

In 1984 he became a Candidate of Geographical Sciences (Thesis “Interaction Models in the Slope Geomorphology”, defended in MSU, Research Advisor – Professor Y.G. Simonov).

In 1998 he became a Doctor of Geographical Sciences (Thesis “Dynamics, Stability and Control over of the Marine Shore Eco Geosystems”, defended in Kharkov State University, Research Supervisor – Professor V.E. Nekos).

Since 1997 he has worked as a professor in Kharkov State (National) University (since 2006 – part-time Professor position, since 2012 – acting Head of the Ecology and Neoecology Department).

Since 2006 he has worked in Belgorod State University/BSU (until 2007 as an active Vice Prorector of Research Work, since 2007 as a Professor of World Economy Department, since 2013 as a Head of the Center of Scientometrics and University Competitiveness Supporting).

From 1976 to 1984 he was a member Work Group (later Commission) “System Analysis and Mathematical Modeling”  of International Geographical Union.

From 1980 to 1990 he worked as a Freelance Referent for the VINITI (All-Union Institute of Scientific and Technical Information), Moscow

Since 2007 he has published his works in such Journals as Scientific and Technical Information Processing, Automatic Documentation and Mathematical Linguistics, Webology, Cybermetrics and other.

Since 2008 he has published articles on General Scientific Problems in Academic Periodicals “Poisk” and “Troitskiy Variant”, on the Internet Portals “Rosnauka” and “Chastny Korrespondent” (Moscow). 

Since 2008 he made a significant contribution to the integration of the post Soviet Universities into the international movement of the Open Access to the scientific knowledge (Belgorod Declaration of the Open Access to the scientific knowledge and cultural heritage, creating a chain of the Open Access repositories in Russian and Ukrainian border zone Universities).

Since 2017- to date -National Open Access Contact Point Coordinator of OA2020Initiative (Max Plank Digital Library)  https://oa2020.org/be-informed/#info

Contribution to science 

During the 1980s created a harmonious system of diffusion models of relief development on a fundamental mathematical basis (boundary problems of the mathematical physics of diffusion type) in compliance with the knowledge of mechanism of geomorphological process.

During the 1990s he laid the theoretical foundation for the dynamics, stability and control over of the marine shore systems on the basis of the dynamic system’s qualitative theory.

At the end of the 20th century the beginning of the 21st introduces systematic information and scientometric approach to research practice; laid the foundation for a conception of the mathematical modeling of the competitive and cooperative interaction in social and economic systems; developed benchmarking (matrix and analytical) tools for the comparative studies of the territorial and innovative systems; developed a methodological tools which help to improve academic competitiveness of the Universities and Scientific Periodicals.

In 1994 he received one of the first mathematical description of the Laffer curve. https://www.researchgate.net/publication/352932074_Optimalnoe_nalogooblozenie_predpriatij_v_usloviah_rynocnoj_ekonomiki_V_MoskovkinBiznes_Inform_-_1994_-_No_15_-_S_17

During the 2000s he made a key contribution into the study of early period of scientific activity of the Nobel Prize winner in economics – Simon Kuznets.

In 2010, he was included in Open Access bibliography called “Transforming Scholarly Publishing Through Open Access: A Bibliography” by a famous American bibliographer Charles W. Bailey, Jr. https://books.google.ru/books?hl=ru&lr=&id=bl49OgJCvCYC&oi=fnd&pg=PA1&dq=Transforming+OR+Scholarly+%22Charles+W.Bailey%22&ots=tmc5DUIOpn&sig=QPfrc6P4KZhBdcTk0jB60dqLLSA&redir_esc=y#v=onepage&q=Transforming%20OR%20Scholarly%20%22Charles%20W.Bailey%22&f=false

In 2016, he was among the 22 most productive researchers on the theme Open Access who published at least five "Scopus" articles in the period up to 2014. https://www.mdpi.com/2304-6775/4/1/1/htm

Major works

Books 

Mathematic Modeling in the Slope Geomorphology (1983) – coauthor A.M. Trofimov.

Articles 

About 600 articles in Russian and 80 in English, including publicistics:

Acknowledgment Features. There are So Many Good Periodicals // Poisk. — 2008. — 12 January(in the Russian language)

Cognition Comes Through Comparison. Russia Needs Own Top Universities Ranking // Poisk. — 2008. — 20 April. (in the Russian language)

Secret contributions. Time For Open-Access Scientific Papers // Poisk. — 2008. — 30 May. (in the Russian language)

High Time To Share Secrets? Russia: How Much Longer To Keep Aloof From Process of Open Access // Poisk. — 2008. — 10 September. (in the Russian language)

Looking For a Way Out. Scientific Contribution Not to Be Lost On the Web // Poisk. — 2009. — 26 March. (in the Russian language)

Reversal of the sum… Do Russian Universities Really Need To Be Globally Ranked? // Poisk. — 2009. — 28 April (in the Russian language)

Up to the border crossing. Close Investigation Reveals New Facts About Nobel Prize Winner Simon Kuznets // Poisk. — 2010. — №1-2. 15 January (in the Russian language)

Simon Kuznec We Didn't Know. Epistolary with relatives and archival and historical prospecting // Digest Е. — April 2010. — № 4 (129) (in the Russian language)

Hazardous Splashes. Not Every Fountain to Bring Coolness and Freshness // Poisk. — 2011. — №17 (in the Russian language)

Word Power. Formalized Analysis of Bookish Texts Brings Unexpected Results // Poisk. — 2012. — №21] (in the Russian language)

Using the Approximation Method To Strengthen the Position of Russian Scientific Periodicals International Experience Orientation Is Necessary //Poisk. — 2012. — №40 (in the Russian language)

Liquids Instead of Solids? Scientific Publications Move To WWW // Poisk. — 2012. — №44 (in the Russian language)

"Inconvertible" Science // Zerkalo Nedeli (Week’s Mirror)  — 2013. — №1. (in the Russian language)

Ready All! How To Boost Russian Universities Positions In Global Rankings // Poisk. — 2013. — №3-4. (in the Russian language)

Poor «Observability» of Russian And Ukrainian Science // Troitsky Variant. — 2013. — № 123. (in the Russian language)

Getting out of honeypot. Publication race harms science // Poisk. — 2015. — №1-2. (in the Russian language)

How to promote Russian scientific journals to international scientometric bases // Rosnauka. — 2015. — №149. (in the Russian language)

Scientific social networks and the level of knowledge degradation in modern society // Rosnauka.  — 2015. — №216. (in the Russian language)

How burdensome are bibliometrics games for taxpayers? // Rosnauka. — 2015. — №275. (in the Russian language)

How to improve university ranking by means of Internet // Rosnauka. — 2015. — №324. (in the Russian language)

Road to nowhere. What is hidden behind "Publish or Perish" slogan? // Poisk. — 2015. — №15. (in the Russian language)

Higher education global trends: disneyfication, global talent vacuum cleaner and virtual environment // Rosnauka. — 2015. — №391. (in the Russian language)

Is Russia to take part in race to 5G? // Rosnauka. — 2015. — №516. (in the Russian language)

Russia to create its own scientific information research tool // Rosnauka. — 2015. — №603. (in the Russian language)

Should Russia create its own scientific information research tool? // Rosnauka. — 2015. — №629. (in the Russian language)

Science under lock and key, or the problem of open access to scientific knowledge // Rosnauka. — 2015. — №853. (in the Russian language)

How to catch an interesting article in the deep waters of "scientific garbage" // Rosnauka. — 2015. — №863. (in the Russian language)

How to improve the monitoring of the publication activity: an expert's opinion // Rosnauka. — 2015. — №884. (in the Russian language)

Trust, but double-check. How to keep your identity in the publication race // Poisk. — 2015. — №35. (in the Russian language)

Webometrics. The case for universities // Troitsky Variant. — 2017. — № 266. (in the Russian language)

European Union revolutionary movement: Publication of all the scientific result research in Open Access // Troitsky variant. - 2017. – July.-. — № 233. (in Russian language).

This crazy, absurd, incompetent scientific world // Chastny Korrespondent. - 2017. - November 4. (in the Russian language).

Report of the club of Rome. Orgies of self-criticism//Chastny Korrespondent. — 2018. - June 19.(in the Russian language).

How to calculate the ruble exchange rate against the dollar and protect domestic producers//Chastny Korrespondent. — 2018. - October 7. (in the Russian language).

10 Principles of Plan S of the European Union: Accelerating the transition to full and urgent Open Access to scientific publications//Troitsky Variant . — 2018. - Nov. 20 — № 267. ( in the Russian language).

Is the future of scientific publication Open Access? Making scientific knowledge available to everyone (co-author Elena Sherstyukova )//Troitsky variant. — 2019. - Jan. 17. (in the Russian language).

Open access to scientific knowledge. Dutch experience for Russia // Troitsky variant . - 2019. - January 29. (in the Russian language).

Let's weigh the chances. Can we conquer global university rankings ?//Poisk. — 2019. - February 8.. — №6.(in the Russian language).

Guidelines for the implementation of EU Plan S. Challenge for Russia // Troitsky variant. - 2019. - February 26. — No. 273  (in the Russian language).

TOP 100 vs "5-100". What are the chances of Russian universities to enter the top 100 in a year? // Troitsky variant. - 2019. - March 12. — No. 274.(in the Russian language).

How Russia and the advanced countries of the world are moving towards Open Access//Troitsky variant. — 2019. - June 4. — № 280 (in the Russian language).

Yalta notes. A look from Kharkov and Yalta. Part I//Chastny Korrespondent. — 2020. - Feb. 16(in the Russian language).

Yalta notes. A look from Kharkov and Yalta. Part II//Chastny Korrespondent. — 2020. - Feb. 18(in the Russian language).

Yalta notes. A look from Kharkov and Yalta. Part III//Chastny Korrespondent. — 2020. - Feb. 24(in the Russian language).

Yalta notes. A look from Kharkov and Yalta. Part IV//Chastny Korrespondent. — 2020. - Feb. 25(in the Russian language).

Yalta notes. A look from Kharkov and Yalta. Part V//Chastny Korrespondent. — 2020. - Feb. 27(in the Russian language).

Yalta notes. A look from Kharkov and Yalta. Part VI//Chastny Korrespondent. — 2020. - Oct. 7(in the Russian language).

Yalta notes. A look from Kharkov and Yalta. Part VII//Chastny Korrespondent. — 2021. - January 7(in the Russian language).

Links 
 Who Is Who
 Russian Scientists
 Biobibliographical index in Research Library of BSU
 Ongoing Russian-Ukrainian Advanced Studies and Innovative Technologies Seminar (BSU)  by Professor V.M. Moskovkin
 Ongoing Scientific and Methodological Seminar of “Methodology of Socioeconomical Research”( BSU) by Professor V.M. Moskovkin 
 Research Gate Platform Profile (in English)
 Google Scholar

Russian geographers
Ukrainian geographers
1952 births
Living people